Mohamed Amer (born 23 April 1954) is an Egyptian football manager.

References

1954 births
Living people
Egyptian footballers
Al Ahly SC players
Egypt international footballers
Egyptian football managers
Al Mokawloon Al Arab SC managers
Al Ittihad Alexandria Club managers
Ghazl El Mahalla SC managers
Egyptian Premier League managers
Association footballers not categorized by position